The Jack Kerouac School of Disembodied Poetics is a school of Naropa University, located in Boulder, Colorado, United States. It was founded in 1974 by Allen Ginsberg and Anne Waldman, as part of Chögyam Trungpa Rinpoche’s 100-year experiment.

Its programs consist of a BA in creative writing and literature, a residential MFA in creative writing and poetics, an MFA in creative writing, the undergraduate Core Writing Seminars and the Summer Writing Program. 
The Kerouac School states that among its aims is to bring forward "new questions that both invigorate and challenge the current dialogue in writing today".

Curriculum
Students at the Kerouac School are encouraged to take classes across "an open genre curriculum", enabling a personal development of writing process and style, and claims this "challenges the notion of safe or generic works and creates a space for radical exploration and experimentation". 
While cultivating contemplative and experimental writing practices, the school emphasizes original, innovative approaches to literary arts.

In When I Was Cool: My Life at the Jack Kerouac School (2004), Sam Kashner wrote an account of his time as the first student of the school.

The Summer Writing program at the school gathers over sixty guest faculty to an internationally renowned colloquium of workshops, lectures, and readings. 

The school currently has three fully funded fellowships: the Anne Waldman, Allen Ginsberg, and Anselm Hollo Graduate Fellowships, awarded annually to Writing and poetics students in graduate instructor positions.

External links
 Jack Kerouac School of Disembodied Poetics on Naropa University site
 Official Blog
 Naropa Poetics Audio Archives at Archive.org
 Anne Waldman, Marilyn Webb, (Eds) Talking poetics from Naropa Institute: annals of the Jack Kerouac School of Disembodied Poetics, Volume 1, Taylor & Francis, 1979, 
 Anne Waldman, Marilyn Webb, (Eds) Talking poetics from Naropa Institute: annals of the Jack Kerouac School of Disembodied Poetics, Volume 2, Taylor & Francis, 1979,

References

Naropa University
Educational institutions established in 1974
1974 establishments in Colorado